Matt Bahner (born March 12, 1990) is an American former soccer player who last played as a defender for USL Championship club El Paso Locomotive.

Career
Bahner played four years of college soccer at University of Cincinnati between 2008 and 2012, although he missed the entirety of the 2011 season due to injury. He also played for Cincinnati Kings and Michigan Bucks, both of the USL PDL during his time at college.

Bahner signed with USL Pro club Harrisburg City Islanders on April 3, 2013.

Jacksonville Armada
Prior to the 2015 season, Bahner was transferred to the newly formed NASL club, Jacksonville Armada. After the 2016 season, Bahner was one of only a few remaining players from the beginning of the Armadas franchise. A highly productive defender has mostly been a starter in his NASL career, and has managed to score 2 goals as a defender.

FC Cincinnati
In January 2017, Bahner signed with United Soccer League club FC Cincinnati for their 2017 season. On October 25, 2017, the club confirmed that Bahner would return for the 2018 season.

Saint Louis FC
On December 18, 2018, Saint Louis FC announced they had signed Bahner as FC Cincinnati was moving up to Major League Soccer and thus undergoing major roster changes. Saint Louis head coach Anthony Pulis spoke positively of Bahner, saying in a press release, "He's a fantastic athlete, good in the air and uses the ball really well, not to mention he has experience of being successful in the league which is important."

El Paso Locomotive
On August 6, 2020, Bahner joined USL Championship side El Paso Locomotive. He made 57 appearances for the club before retiring at the end of the 2022 season.

References

External links

 University of Cincinnati profile
 El Paso profile
 

1990 births
Living people
American soccer players
Soccer players from Ohio
Sportspeople from the Cincinnati metropolitan area
People from West Chester, Butler County, Ohio
Association football midfielders
Cincinnati Bearcats men's soccer players
Cincinnati Kings players
Flint City Bucks players
Penn FC players
Jacksonville Armada FC players
FC Cincinnati (2016–18) players
El Paso Locomotive FC players
Saint Louis FC players
USL Championship players
North American Soccer League players
USL League Two players